is a railway station in Moriyama-ku, Nagoya, Aichi Prefecture, Japan, operated by Central Japan Railway Company (JR Tōkai).  It is also  freight depot for the Japan Freight Railway Company.

Lines
Shin-Moriyama Station is served by the Chūō Main Line, and is located 384.6 kilometers from the starting point of the line at Tokyo Station and 12.3 kilometers from Nagoya Station.

Station layout
The station has two elevated island platforms with the station building below.The station building has automated ticket machines, TOICA automated turnstiles and is staffed.

Platforms

Adjacent stations

|-
!colspan=5|JR Central

Station history
Shin-Moriyama Station was opened on April 1, 1964. Along with the division and privatization of JNR on April 1, 1987, the station came under the control and operation of the Central Japan Railway Company.

Passenger statistics
In fiscal 2017, the station was used by an average of 8179 passengers daily (arriving passengers only).

Surrounding area
Moriyama Nishi Junior High School
Nijo Elementary School
Japan National Route 19

See also
 List of Railway Stations in Japan

References

External links

JR Central official home page

Railway stations in Japan opened in 1964
Railway stations in Aichi Prefecture
Chūō Main Line
Stations of Central Japan Railway Company
Stations of Japan Freight Railway Company
Railway stations in Nagoya